On April 15, 2013, an envelope that preliminarily tested positive for ricin, a highly toxic protein, was intercepted at the US Capitol's off-site mail facility in Washington, D.C. According to reports, the envelope was addressed to the office of Mississippi Republican Senator Roger Wicker. On April 17, 2013, an envelope addressed to President of the United States Barack Obama preliminarily tested positive for ricin.

Both letters, which were mailed from Memphis, Tennessee, included the phrases "No one wanted to listen to me before. There are still 'Missing Pieces.' Maybe I have your attention now even if that means someone must die. This must stop. To see a wrong and not expose it, is to become a silent partner to its continuance." and "I am KC and I approve this message."

A third letter mailed to a Mississippi judge, Lee County Justice Court Judge Sadie Holland, that was received and opened on April 10, contained similar language and was sent for testing. The FBI claimed the letters tested positive for ricin.

Early suspect released 

On April 17, 2013, FBI agents detained a Corinth, Mississippi, man on suspicion of mailing the ricin-laced letters. All charges were dropped however, and he was released on April 23, 2013. Federal investigators reported that they could find no evidence linking him to the letters.  An FBI agent testified that no ricin or precursors were found in the man's home, nor did a preliminary forensic analysis of his computer reveal anything related to ricin. The defense attorney claimed in court that his client was being framed, possibly by a man with whom he had been feuding online.

Second arrest 

On April 23, agents in hazardous materials suits searched the home of a Tupelo, Mississippi man in connection with the ricin investigation. On April 27, the man, identified as James Everett Dutschke, was arrested in connection with the case. Under suspicion since the release of the prior suspect, Dutschke denied the allegations through his lawyer. Saying that new information had been discovered in the case, authorities who had placed his house under surveillance arrested Dutschke in the early hours of April 27. Later that day, Dutschke was charged with attempted use of a biological weapon.  On June 3, 2013, Dutschke was indicted by a federal grand jury on five counts.  He was indicted for producing and using the deadly toxin as a weapon, and using the mail to threaten President Obama, Sen. Roger Wicker of Mississippi and Lee County Judge Sadie Holland.

In May 2014, Dutschke pleaded guilty and was sentenced to 25 years in prison.

See also 

 Incidents involving ricin
 Boston Marathon bombings, a terrorist attack that was mistakenly connected to the letters.

References 

Bioterrorism
2013
Terrorist incidents in the United States in 2013
Failed terrorist attempts in the United States
Failed assassination attempts in the United States
Letters (message)
Presidency of Barack Obama
April 2013 events in the United States
Terrorist incidents involving postal systems